Tambor is a district of the Alajuela canton, in the Alajuela province of Costa Rica.

History 
Tambor was created on 6 November 1922 by Decreto 28.

Geography 
Tambor has an area of  km² and an elevation of  metres.

Demographics 

For the 2011 census, Tambor had a population of  inhabitants.

Transportation

Road transportation 
The district is covered by the following road routes:
 National Route 107
 National Route 118
 National Route 718
 National Route 719
 National Route 727

References 

Districts of Alajuela Province
Populated places in Alajuela Province